Guasave is a city and the seat of the homonymous municipality in the Mexican state of Sinaloa. It is located in the northwestern part of Mexico, southeast of the city of Los Mochis.

In the 2010 census, the city reported a population of 71,196, making it the fourth-largest community in the state, after Culiacán, Mazatlán, and Los Mochis. The municipality has a land area of 3,464.41 km2 (1,337.62 sq mi) and includes many other outlying communities, the largest of which are Juan José Ríos, Gabriel Leyva Solano, and Adolfo Ruiz Cortines. Its biggest local celebration,  falls every year on November 12.

Transportation
The city is served by Campo Cuatro Milpas Airport, offering air services within the region.

Tourist attractions
San Ignacio Bay and Navachiste Bay are popular for watersports. Many people also frequent Las Glorias beach. Guasave also features the colonial area of Tamazula, with its famous Franciscan era church. Nearby lie the ruins of Pueblo Viejo and Nío, which date from the time of the Jesuits from the 17th century until their expulsion in 1767.
Visitors can also go to Parque Villafañe, a local park named after the city's founder which consists of several outdoor areas including a basketball court, as well as a mini-train which circles the entirety of the park, popular amongst children.

Sports
The Algodoneros ("Cotton Growers") professional baseball team of the Mexican Pacific League are based in Guasave. The football team Diablos Azules de Guasave ("Blue Devils") is part of the soccer league Tercera División de México and plays in Group 11. The basketball Team Liebres de Guasave ("Guasave Hares") is a semi-professional team who play in CIBAPAC.

Main Industries
Situated near the coast, fish farming or aquaculture is a primary industry in Guasave.
Also important are ranching and agriculture.

Manufacturing and other types of businesses tend to be small-to-medium-sized.

Archaeology
The Guasave archaeological site, belonging to Capacha culture, was excavated by archaeologist Gordon Ekholm in the 1940s. It became known as the greatest formal cemetery mound in Northwest Mexico that has been excavated.

He found several pottery types including red wares, red-on-buff, finely incised wares and several types of highly detailed polychrome pottery. Also, alabaster vases and copper implements were found. Cotton textiles were also used by these peoples.

Capacha culture goes back to 2000–1500 BC.

Notable people
 

 Arturo López Castro (born 1989) professional boxer

References
Sinaloa Enciclopedia de los Municipios de México

External links
Ayuntamiento de Guasave Official website
Todo sobre Guasave!

 
Populated places in Sinaloa
Populated places established in 1595
Capacha culture